Beitun Main Station is a metro station operated by Taichung Metro located in Beitun District, Taichung, Taiwan. It is the eastern terminus of the Green Line, and is located near the depot of the entire line.

Around the station
Beitun Main station is located within a new development zone. With the construction of the new station, the surrounding area saw rapid development, including a planned Costco store.

Station structure

References

2020 establishments in Taiwan
Taichung Metro
Railway stations in Taichung
Railway stations opened in 2020